The Fairmount Hotel is a historic, former hotel located in Portland, Oregon, United States, built in 1905. It is listed on the National Register of Historic Places.

The hotel was constructed for the Lewis and Clark Centennial Exposition, located on 26th Avenue across from what was then the fair's main gate. The hotel was furnished by Meier & Frank. It is one of the very few extant structures associated with the 1905 world's fair.

References

1905 establishments in Oregon
Apartment buildings on the National Register of Historic Places in Portland, Oregon
Hotel buildings completed in 1905
Hotel buildings on the National Register of Historic Places in Portland, Oregon
Northwest Portland, Oregon
Portland Historic Landmarks
Lewis and Clark Centennial Exposition